Katherin Oriana Echandia Zárate (born 14 August 2001) is a Venezuelan weightlifter. She won the bronze medal in the women's 45 kg event at the 2018 World Weightlifting Championships held in Ashgabat, Turkmenistan. She won two gold medals at the 2022 Bolivarian Games held in Valledupar, Colombia.

Career 

She won the gold medal in the girls' 44kg event at the 2018 Summer Youth Olympics held in Buenos Aires, Argentina. A month later, she won the bronze medal in the women's 45 kg event at the 2018 World Weightlifting Championships in Ashgabat, Turkmenistan. She also competed in the women's 49 kg event at the 2019 World Weightlifting Championships in Pattaya, Thailand.

She won the bronze medal in the women's 49 kg event at the 2021 Junior Pan American Games held in Cali and Valle, Colombia.

She won two gold medals at the 2022 Bolivarian Games held in Valledupar, Colombia. 
She won the gold medal in her event at the 2022 South American Games held in Asunción, Paraguay. Two months later, she competed in the women's 49kg event at the 2022 World Weightlifting Championships held in Bogotá, Colombia.

Achievements

References

External links 
 

Living people
2001 births
Venezuelan female weightlifters
Weightlifters at the 2018 Summer Youth Olympics
Medalists at the 2018 Summer Youth Olympics
Youth Olympic gold medalists for Venezuela
World Weightlifting Championships medalists
South American Games gold medalists for Venezuela
South American Games medalists in weightlifting
Competitors at the 2022 South American Games
21st-century Venezuelan women